William Hammond may refer to:

Sports
William Hammond (cyclist) (1886–?), British Olympic road racing cyclist 
William Hammond (fencer) (1872–?), British Olympic fencer at the 1920 and 1924 Olympics
William Hammond (cricketer) (fl.1855–1868)

Politicians
William Hammond (died 1763), British Member of Parliament for Southwark
William Hammond (died 1575), MP for Guildford

Others
William Hammond (died 1685) (c.1635–c.1685), Original Fellow of the Royal Society
 William Hammond (1707–1787), Danish landowner
William Hammond (hymnist) (1719–1783), English hymnist
William A. Hammond (1828–1900), neurologist, 11th US Army Surgeon General
Bill Hammond (1947–2021), New Zealand artist
William Hammond (ship), a barque used to transport convicts to Western Australia
William Hammond (historian), American historian
William Archie Hammond, founder of the W.A. Hammond Drierite Company
William C. Hammond (born 1947), American novelist of historical fiction
William Churchill Hammond (1860–1949), American organist and music educator

Hammond, William